Luogang may refer to the following locations in China:

 Luogang District (萝岗区), Guangzhou
 Hefei Luogang International Airport (合肥骆岗国际机场), main airport serving Hefei, Anhui
 Luogang Subdistrict, Guangzhou (萝岗街道), in Luogang District, Guangzhou, Guangdong
 Luogang Subdistrict, Hefei (骆岗街道), in Baohe District, Hefei, Anhui
 Luogang Town, Hefei (骆岗镇), in Baohe District, Hefei, Anhui